Cathedral of the Nativity of the Theotokos or Cathedral of the Nativity of the Mother of God may refer to:

 Cathedral of the Nativity of the Theotokos, Rostov-on-Don, Russia
 Cathedral of the Nativity of the Theotokos, Sarajevo, Bosnia and Herzegovina
 Cathedral of the Nativity of the Theotokos, Suzdal, Russia
 Cathedral of the Nativity of the Theotokos, Ufa, Russia

See also
 Church of the Nativity of the Theotokos (disambiguation)
 Cathedral of the Nativity of the Blessed Virgin Mary (disambiguation)
 Church of the Nativity of the Blessed Virgin Mary (disambiguation)
 Church of the Nativity (disambiguation)
 Church of the Dormition of the Theotokos (disambiguation)